In mathematics, specifically in functional analysis and Hilbert space theory, the fundamental theorem of Hilbert spaces gives a necessarily and sufficient condition for a Hausdorff pre-Hilbert space to be a Hilbert space in terms of the canonical isometry of a pre-Hilbert space into its anti-dual.

Preliminaries

Antilinear functionals and the anti-dual 

Suppose that  is a topological vector space (TVS). 
A function  is called semilinear or antilinear  if for all  and all scalars  ,

Additive: ;
Conjugate homogeneous: .

Pre-Hilbert spaces and sesquilinear forms 

Note that in Physics, the convention is that a sesquilinear form is linear in its second coordinate and antilinear in its first coordinate. 

Pre-Hilbert and Hilbert spaces 

if in addition this sesquilinear form  is positive definite then  is called a Hausdorff pre-Hilbert space.  
This canonical semi-norm makes every pre-Hilbert space into a seminormed space and every Hausdorff pre-Hilbert space into a normed space. 
A Hausdorff pre-Hilbert space that is complete is called a Hilbert space.

Canonical map into the anti-dual 

Suppose  is a pre-Hilbert space. If , we define the canonical maps:

  where  ,  and

  where  

The canonical map  from  into its anti-dual  is the map 

If  is a pre-Hilbert space then this canonical map is linear and continuous; 
this map is an isometry onto a vector subspace of the anti-dual if and only if  is a Hausdorff pre-Hilbert. 

Fundamental theorem 

Fundamental theorem of Hilbert spaces:  Suppose that  is a Hausdorff pre-Hilbert space where  is a sesquilinear form that is linear in its first coordinate and antilinear in its second coordinate.

See also 

 Complex conjugate vector space
 Dual system
 Hilbert space
 Pre-Hilbert space
 Linear map
 Riesz representation theorem
 Sesquilinear form

References 

  
  
  

Topological vector spaces
Linear functionals